Bakel en Milheeze is a former municipality in the Dutch province of North Brabant. It consisted of the villages Bakel, Milheeze, and De Rips. It has been a part of the municipality of Gemert-Bakel since 1997.

Municipalities of the Netherlands disestablished in 1997
Former municipalities of North Brabant
Gemert-Bakel